= 2004 United States Court of Appeals for the District of Columbia Circuit opinions of John Roberts =

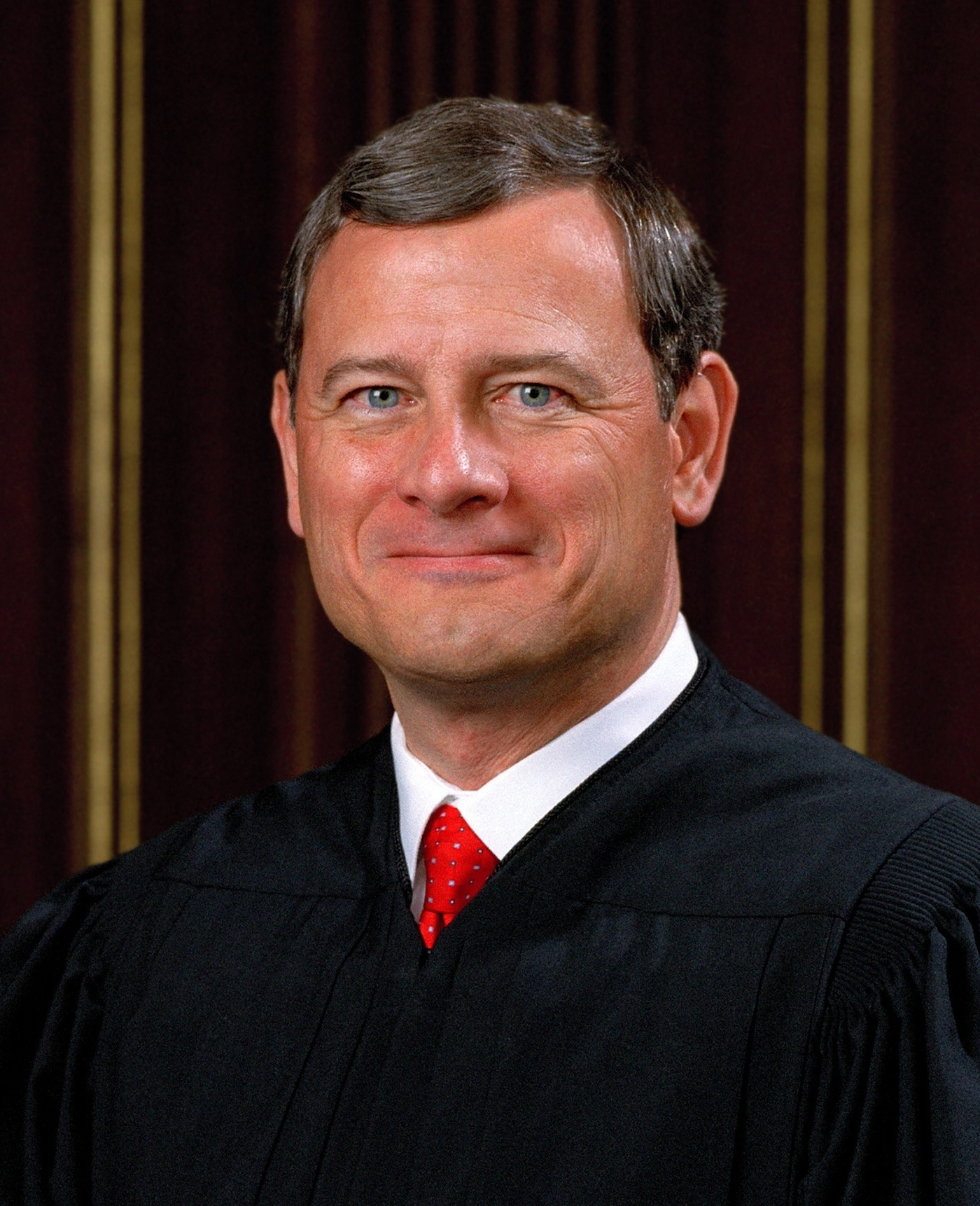
John G. Roberts, Jr.

John Roberts served his first and only full year on the United States Court of Appeals for the District of Columbia Circuit in 2004. The following are opinions written by Judge Roberts in 2004.

January 2004
Sierra Club v. Environmental Protection Agency, 353 F.3d 976 (D.C. Cir. January 13, 2004).

February 2004
LeMoyne-Owen College v. National Labor Relations Board, 357 F.3d 55 (D.C. Cir. February 10, 2004).
In re: James M. Tennant, 359 F.3d 523 (D.C. Cir. February 24, 2004).
Graham v. Ashcroft, 358 F.3d 931 (D.C. Cir. February 24, 2004).

March 2004
United States v. Stanfield, 360 F.3d 1346 (D.C. Cir. March 19, 2004).

April 2004
Duchek v. National Transportation Safety Board, 364 F.3d 311 (D.C. Cir. April 16, 2004).
International Action Center v. United States, 365 F.3d 20 (D.C. Cir. April 16, 2004).

May 2004
Consumers Energy v. Federal Energy Regulatory Commission, 367 F.3d 915 (D.C. Cir. May 4, 2004).

June 2004
Independent Equipment Dealers Association v. Environmental Protection Agency, 372 F.3d 420 (D.C. Cir. June 25, 2004).
Jung v. Mundy, Holt, & Mance, P.C. et al, 372 F.3d 429 (D.C. Cir. June 25, 2004).

July 2004
National Council of Resistance of Iran v. Department of State, 373 F.3d 152 (D.C. Cir. July 9, 2004).
Williams Gas Processing v. FERC, 373 F.3d 1335 (D.C. Cir. July 13, 2004).
Midwest ISO Transmission Owners v. FERC, 373 F.3d 1361 (D.C. Cir. July 16, 2004).
United States v. Smith (374 F.3d 1240), 374 F.3d 1240 (D.C. Cir. July 20, 2004).
In re: Gordon R. England, 375 F.3d 1169 (D.C. Cir. July 27, 2004).

August 2004
United States ex rel Totten v. Bombardier, 380 F.3d 488 (D.C. Cir. August 27, 2004).

October 2004
United States v. Holmes (385 F.3d 786), 385 F.3d 786 (D.C. Cir. October 19, 2004).
United States v. Tucker, 386 F.3d 273 (D.C. Cir. October 26, 2004).
Hedgepeth v. Washington Metro Area Transit Authority, 386 F.3d 1148 (D.C. Cir. October 26, 2004).

December 2004
United States v. West, 392 F.3d 450 (D.C. Cir. December 10, 2004).
United States v. Mellen, 393 F.3d 175 (D.C. Cir. December 21, 2004).
